Monsieur Fabre (Mr Fabre) is a 90-minute black and white French film comedy from 1951, directed by Henri Diamant-Berger and produced by Diamant-Berger and Walter Futter. It was on 35mm film, in 1,37:1 format, with monophonic sound. It was released in France on 5 July 1951.

Plot
It centres on the life of the entomologist Jean-Henri Fabre and his total devotion to studying insect behavior, travelling from Avignon to Paris, from Paris to his death in Sérignan. He is honoured by the French president Raymond Poincaré and his patience, obstinacy and knowledge are also recognised by Napoleon III, the publisher Charles Delagrave and the philosopher John Stuart Mill. They reach their climax in his book, Souvenirs entomologiques.

Crew 
 Director : Henri Diamant-Berger
 Screenplay : Henri Diamant-Berger and Jack Kirkland
 Adaptation and dialogue : Henri Diamant-Berger and Jack Kirkland
 Sets :  Robert Giordani
 Costumes : Rosine Delamare
 Photography : Claude Renoir and Horace Woodard	
 Sound : William-Robert Sivel
 Film editing: Christian Gaudin
 Music : Hubert d'Auriol
 Producer: Raymond Borderie
 Production : CICC, UGC, Films d'Art and Fidès
 Production Director : Walter Rupp

Cast 
 Pierre Fresnay : Henri Fabre
 Elina Labourdette : the Comtesse De Latour
 André Randall : John Stuart Mill
 Georges Tabet : the director at Avignon
 Olivier Hussenot : the 'doyen' at Avignon
 Espanita Cortez : Empress Eugénie
 Paul Bonifas : Victor Duruy
 Jacques Emmanuel : Charles Delagrave
 Albert Culloz : Jules Fabre
 France Descaut : Antonia Fabre
 Hubert Noël : Antonia's lover
 Catherine Culloz : Claire Fabre
 Jean-Pierre Maurin (as J. P. Maurin) : Napoléon, Prince Imperial
 Elisabeth Hardy : Marie Fabre
 Pierre Bertin : Napoléon III
 Solange Varenne : second woman
 Patrick Dewaere : Émile

Notes

1951 comedy-drama films
1950s biographical films
French comedy-drama films
French biographical films
1951 films
Cultural depictions of Napoleon III
French black-and-white films
1950s French films